Caddo Public Schools can refer to:
Caddo Public Schools (Oklahoma); see List of school districts in Oklahoma
Caddo Public Schools (Louisiana)

See also
Caddo Mills Independent School District, Caddo Mills, Texas